Grace Santana Balado is an attorney and former Puerto Rico Chief of Staff. Before her appointment, Santana Balado served as executive director of the Authority for the Financing of the Infrastructure of Puerto Rico (AFI) and as executive director of the Puerto Rico Public-Private Partnerships Authority (PPPA).

Notes

References

Chiefs of Staff of Puerto Rico
Year of birth missing (living people)
Living people